Assanur Rijal (born 2 March 1996) is an Indonesian professional footballer who plays as a forward for Liga 2 club Bekasi City.

Club career

Aceh United
In 2017 he joined Aceh United to compete in 2017 Liga 3. By the end of the season, he helped Aceh United to promote to Liga 2 for 2018 season. He was chosen as the best player of the league for this season, as well. The following season, he helped Aceh United to advance to second round in 2018 Liga 2, however, the team failed to secure a promotion to Liga 1. In the beginning of 2019, Aceh United was sold to other owner, and Assanur Rijal decided to resign from the club.

Persiraja
In 2019 he joined another club from Aceh, Persiraja to compete in 2019 Liga 2. He was the top goalscorer of the club in this season with 12 goals, and became the second top goalscorer of the league. He also helped Persiraja to promote to Liga 1.  He scored the winning goal for Persiraja in the third place play-off against Sriwijaya. He made his Liga 1 debut on February 29, 2020, when Persiraja hosted Bhayangkara F.C. in the first Persiraja's match in 2020 Liga 1.

Persis Solo
In 2021, Assanur Rijal signed a contract with Indonesian Liga 2 club Persis Solo. He made his league debut on 5 October against Persijap Jepara at the Manahan Stadium, Surakarta.

Return to Persiraja
He was signed for Persiraja Banda Aceh to play in the Liga 1 in the 2021-22 season. Rijal made his league debut on 7 January 2022 in a match against PSS Sleman at the Ngurah Rai Stadium, Denpasar.

Bekasi City
On 7 June 2022, it was announced that Rijal would be joining Bekasi City for the 2022-23 Liga 2 campaign.

Club statistics

Honours

Club 
Aceh United
 Liga 3 third place: 2018

Persiraja
  Liga 2 third place: 2019

Persis Solo
 Liga 2: 2021

Individual
 Liga 3 Best Player: 2017
 Menpora Cup Top Scorer: 2021
 Menpora Cup Best Eleven: 2021

References

External links
 Assanur Rijal at Soccerway
 Assanur Rijal at Liga Indonesia

1996 births
Association football forwards
Living people
Indonesian footballers
Liga 1 (Indonesia) players
Persiraja Banda Aceh players
People from Aceh Besar Regency
Sportspeople from Aceh